The America Zone was one of the three regional zones of the 1964 Davis Cup.

7 teams entered the America Zone, with the winner going on to compete in the Inter-Zonal Zone against the winners of the Eastern Zone and Europe Zone. Australia defeated Chile in the final and progressed to the Inter-Zonal Zone.

Draw

Quarterfinals

Mexico vs. New Zealand

Canada vs. Australia

Semifinals

Caribbean/West Indies vs. Chile

Mexico vs. Australia

Final

Australia vs. Chile

References

External links
Davis Cup official website

Davis Cup Americas Zone
America Zone
Davis Cup